North Carolina Highway 43 (NC 43) is a primary state highway in the U.S. state of North Carolina. It connects many towns in the Coastal Plain region.

Route description

History
NC 43 was established around 1928 as a new primary routing between US 17-1/NC 40, in Rocky Mount, and NC 58, in Liberia. In 1931, NC 43 was extended southeast on new primary routing, through Pinetops, to Greenville; then replaced NC 301 to US 17/NC 30, in Vanceboro. Around 1936, NC 43 was rerouted onto new roadway at Essex, avoiding Hollister. In 1958, NC 43 was rerouted in the downtown Greenville area, leaving behind: Charles Avenue, 10th Street, Albemarle Street and 5th Street.

In 1987, NC 43 was extended south of Vanceboro along US 17 Business and US 17 to Weyerhaeuser Road. Traveling along Weyerhaeuser Road, it connects and overlap with NC 55 going into New Bern; then with US 70 Business and southward to US 70 and US 17. The resulting new routing made a western rural bypass of New Bern. In 1998, NC 43 was rerouted onto new connector in downtown Rocky Mount. In 2001, NC 43 was rerouted onto northern bypass route around Rocky Mount, leaving behind NC 43 Bus. In 2009, NC 43 was rerouted onto new road between NC 55 and US 17/US 70, eliminating its routing through New Bern.

Major intersections

Special routes

Rocky Mount business loop

North Carolina Highway 43 Business (NC 43 Bus) was established in 2001, when NC 43 was rerouted to bypass north of downtown Rocky Mount. The business loop travels along Cokey Road, Fairview Road, Grand Avenue, Grace Street and Falls Road.

Major intersections

In popular culture
North Carolina Highway 43 (NC 43) is used by people travelling to and from Mayberry on The Andy Griffith Show. Notable episodes that reference NC 43 are "Andy's English Valet", "Man In a Hurry" and "Gomer Saves the Day".

References

External links

NCRoads.com: N.C. 43
NCRoads.com: N.C. 43 Bus

043
Transportation in Craven County, North Carolina
Transportation in Pitt County, North Carolina
Transportation in Edgecombe County, North Carolina
Transportation in Nash County, North Carolina
Transportation in Halifax County, North Carolina
Transportation in Warren County, North Carolina